Nee Thanda Kanike (Kannada: ನೀ ತಂದ ಕಾಣಿಕೆ, English : The Gift You Bought) is a 1985 Indian Kannada film, directed and produced by Dwarakish. The film stars Vishnuvardhan, Girish Karnad, Jayasudha and C. R. Simha in the lead roles. The film has musical score by Vijayanand.  It is a remake of the Hindi hit film Sharaabi, (1984) starring Amitabh Bachchan and Jaya Prada, which itself was loosely based on the 1981 American movie Arthur.

Cast 
Vishnuvardhan as Ravi
Girish Karnad
Jayasudha as Meena Devi
C. R. Simha
Sathish
Vadiraj
Sudheer
Mysore Lokesh
Shani Mahadevappa

Soundtrack 
All the songs composed by Vijayanand and written by R. N. Jayagopal.

Critical reception

References

External links 
 
 

1985 films
1980s Kannada-language films
Kannada remakes of Hindi films
Films about inheritances
Films about interclass romance
Films directed by Dwarakish
Films scored by Vijayanand